Sukko is a rural locality (a selo) in Anapsky District of Krasnodar Krai, Russia, located  south of Anapa on the shore of the Black Sea and serving as a resort. Population: 3,156 (2010 Census).It lies in the north of the Abrau Peninsula, in the valley of the small Sukko River wedged between the westernmost spurs of the Caucasus Mountains, otherwise known as the Markotkh. The valley consists of beech, oak, pine and juniper forests. The resort has several recreation centers for children. Sukko is a frequent shooting location for the long-running Yeralash comedy show.

Between Sukko and the seaside selo of Bolshoy Utrish sprawls the Bolshoy Utrish protected area (zakaznik).

Gallery

References

Rural localities in Krasnodar Krai
Seaside resorts in Russia